Murashi is a town and the administrative center of Murashinsky District in Kirov Oblast, Russia, located  northwest of Kirov, the administrative center of the oblast, on the Kirov–Syktyvkar highway. Population:

History
It was founded in 1895 as a settlement due to the construction of the railway station on the Vyatka–Kotlas railway. It was granted town status in 1944.

Administrative and municipal status
Within the framework of administrative divisions, Murashi serves as the administrative center of Murashinsky District. As an administrative division, it is, together with ten rural localities, incorporated within Murashinsky District as the Town of Murashi. As a municipal division, the Town of Murashi is incorporated within Murashinsky Municipal District as Murashinskoye Urban Settlement.

References

Notes

Sources

Cities and towns in Kirov Oblast